Usta Gambar Karabakhi (1830s, in Shusha – 1905, in Shusha) was an Azerbaijani ornamentalist painter, author of impressive decorative paintings with egg tempera (plant and zoomorphic motifs) in the interior of the Palace of Shaki Khans, in houses of Rustamov, Safi bey and Mehmandarov in Shusha and others.}

Creativity
National traditions of wall painting, which is the most valuable legacy of Azerbaijani art, took the main place in the creativity of Usta Gambar Karabakhi. Chased decoration and richness of compositional and color resolutions can be seen in his delicate graphic painting of a complex plant ornament. The painter drew pictures of animals and fantastic beings upon branched ornaments of flowers and plants. The painting also didn't destroy flatness of the wall, but on the contrary, underlined its constructive architectural details.

Later works of Karabakhi, saving a mastery of ancient decorative paintings are distinguished for growth of realistic features in interpretation of distinct graphic motifs. A picture drawn by him in the house of Mehmandarov in Shusha city, where images of deer and pomegranate tree are distinguished for their free interpretation and sappiness of forms, is the most famous picture of the artist. The artist created on the basis of both earlier developed canonized schemes and immediate observations.

Gallery

References

Artists from Shusha
1830s births
1905 deaths
19th-century Azerbaijani painters